Kaisa Leena Mäkäräinen (born 11 January 1983) is a Finnish former world-champion and 3-time world-cup-winning biathlete, who currently competes for Kontiolahden Urheilijat. Outside sports, Mäkäräinen is currently studying to be a Physics teacher at the University of Eastern Finland in Joensuu. Her team coach is Jonne Kähkönen, while Jarmo Punkkinen is her ski coach.

Career

Mäkäräinen was originally a cross-country skier and focused on this until the age of twenty. She started training for the biathlon in 2003. In 2004, she made the Finnish National Team. 2005 saw Mäkäräinen compete at the Biathlon World Championships for the first time. Her best placings in the Biathlon World Championships have occurred at the 2007 World Championships in Antholz-Anterselva, where she placed eighth in the individual 15  and seventh in the mass start events. At the 2008 Biathlon World Championships in Östersund, she was 15th in the mass start. During the 2007-08 Biathlon World Cup, she made it to the podium twice, the first time when she placed second in the sprint at Pokljuka, Slovenia and third in the pursuit at Ruhpolding, Germany. During the 2008–09 Biathlon World Cup, she has steadily risen in the rankings and on she placed second during the pursuit event and third in the mass start after Iourieva and Jonsson at Antholz.

Her best season so far has been the 2010-11 Biathlon World Cup. She made a strong start at the opening event in Östersund, where Mäkäräinen won her first ever World Cup victory in the sprint. Two days later she repeated her success by winning the pursuit, too. She showed her strong early-season form again in Hochfilzen and Pokljuka by reaching the podium in every single event.

Mäkäräinen's form fell somewhat after that as she managed to reach the podium only once in the next 12 starts. Despite this Mäkäräinen scored valuable points in every single race beside the mass start in Antholz. She entered the Biathlon World Championships 2011 in Khanty-Mansiysk in second place for the Overall World Cup (9 points behind Andrea Henkel), but regained the overall World Cup leader's yellow bib after taking the silver medal in the sprint. Mäkäräinen's flawless shooting and fourth-fastest course time secured her career-first gold medal in the pursuit the following day. Mäkäräinen became the second Finnish female to medal in biathlon and the first one since 1987 when Tuija Vuoksiala placed third in the individual . She is also the first Finnish biathlete to medal at the Biathlon World Championships since 2003, since Paavo Puurunen's bronze in the pursuit.

Despite her not-so-good performance in the individual competition and being tied for the overall lead by Helena Ekholm, Mäkäräinen managed to stay on top of the Overall World Cup classification until the very end of the season. In Holmenkollen she grabbed both the Overall and the Pursuit Titles. She was subsequently named the 2011 Finnish Sports Personality of the Year.

She has gone on to win two more overall World Cups, in 2013-14 and 2017-18.

Mäkäräinen has also competed in the FIS Cross-Country World Cup, and she finished 14th in the 10km freestyle event at the 2013 Nordic Skiing World Championships. She was also the 2013 Finnish national champion in the same event. She has continued competing in the national cross-country skiing championships even during her retirement. In January 2021, she notably won a silver medal in a 10 km freestyle competition, with only a few of Finland's current World Cup skiers absent from the event.

Biathlon results
All results are sourced from the International Biathlon Union.

Olympic Games
0 medals

a.  The mixed relay was added as an event in 2014.

World Championships
6 medals (1 gold, 1 silver, 4 bronze)

a.  During Olympic seasons "Mixed-Relay Championships" were held for those events not included in the Olympic program.
b. The single mixed relay was added as an event in 2019.

Junior/Youth World Championships

World Cup standings

a.  Until 2009–10 season, IBU did not count an athlete's three worst races in overall World Cup scores. In 2010–11 season, all races were included in World Cup scores. Starting from 2011–12 season, the two worst results have been eliminated again. So the points in the "Points" column is represented after deduction, except 2010–11 season.
b.  Until 2009–10 season it was required to leave out the result of the worst discipline race for the final result of discipline world cup (if there were four discipline races or more during the season), so the points in the "Points" columns for those seasons is represented after deduction of the result of the worst discipline race.

Individual victories
 27 victories – (8 Sp, 13 Pu, 2 In, 4 MS) 

* Results are from UIPMB and IBU races which include the Biathlon World Cup, Biathlon World Championships and the Winter Olympic Games.

Overall record

a.  Includes mixed relay and single mixed relay, the event involves one male and one female biathlete each completing two legs consisting of one prone and one standing shoot.
b.  Until 2007–08 season, top-30 were awarded with World Cup points and biathlete got 50 points for the win. Starting from 2008–09 season another points system is applied in World Cup, top-40 are awarded with World Cup points and winner got 60 points. Results in "Points" row is represented according to the applied scoring system in corresponding season.

Statistics as of 15 December 2018

Shooting

Results in all IBU World Cup races, Olympics and World Championships including relay events and disqualified races. Statistics as of 25 March 2018.

Cross-country skiing results
All results are sourced from the International Ski Federation (FIS).

World Championships

World Cup

Season standings

Roller-ski biathlon
In the summer of 2007, Mäkäräinen won the world championship in roller-ski biathlon at Otepää in both the 7.5 km sprint and the 10 km pursuit.

References

External links

Statistics at Biathlonworld

1983 births
Living people
People from Ristijärvi
Finnish female cross-country skiers
Finnish female biathletes
Biathletes at the 2010 Winter Olympics
Biathletes at the 2014 Winter Olympics
Biathletes at the 2018 Winter Olympics
Olympic biathletes of Finland
Biathlon World Championships medalists
Holmenkollen Ski Festival winners
Holmenkollen medalists
Sportspeople from Kainuu
21st-century Finnish women